Hiriyuru is a town and taluk headquarters located near Chitradurga in the Indian state of Karnataka.

Hiriyur is renowned for having the oldest dam in Karnataka, built on the Vedavati river, and named Mari Kanive. Hiriyur is situated along National Highway 4.  Hiriyur is located 160 km north of Bangalore.  All the buses from Bangalore going towards Hubli, Belgaum, Davanagere, Bellary pass through Hiriyur.

The climate is generally dry with low rain fall. During winter (November - February), the night temperature may come down to 18 degrees C.

History 
Hiriyur is famous as a centre for regional (rural) markets. The 'santhe' attracts people from all over the district.  It is also famous for the Mari Kanive(Vani Vilaasa Sagara), which is an architectural masterpiece constructed during the rule of the Mysore Wodeyars. The Mari Kanive irrigation project was initiated by Sir. Mark Cubbon, the British Resident of Mysore. C N Malige is one of the villages of Hiriyur taluk and it is situated between Hulithotlu and Adiralu villages. Sub office to this village is Aimangala. The National Highway 4 which passes through Hiriyur has for decades created a cluster of business catering to the commuters. 
Hiriyur is also famous for its 500+ years old temple of Lord Shiva. Famously known as Teru Malleshvara Temple, Hiriyur it is also called as "Dakshina Kashi" by the devotees. It is believed that the famous devotee of Lord Shiva, "Hema Reddy Mallamma", was a resident of this town. Every year she travelled to Varanasi by foot. As she grew older and weaker, one day she prayed to her lord that "O lord I have become old and weak, unable to visit Varanasi and have your darshan, what do I do". On the night of that day Lord Shiva appeared in her dream and told her that she need not come to Varanasi to see him, he himself will come and reside in Hiriyur. As promised, Lord Shiva was believed to have incarnated in the "oraLukallu" (a stone of cylindrical shape used in the households of ancient India for grinding purpose). That stone which was worshipped by Mallamma later became known as Terumalleshwara.

The ancient name of Hiriyur was "Ghanapuri". The "Yeppattu Kannina Setuve" ("the seventy eyed bridge") located near Hiriyur is noted for its architecture. The patterns in the bridge resemble human eye, and there are seventy eyes.

Geography
It has an average elevation of 630 metres (2066 feet). The months of March and April are the hottest months of the year.

National geological monument

Mardihalli Pillow lavas national geo-monument at Mardihalli village near Hiriyur has been declared the National Geological Monuments of India by the Geological Survey of India (GSI), for their protection, maintenance, promotion and enhancement of geotourism.

Demographics
According to 2011 Census of India, Hiriyur had a population of 56,416. Males constitute 49.85% of the population and females 50.15%. Hiriyur has an average literacy rate of 83.63%, higher than the national average of 74.04%: male literacy is 88.48%, and female literacy is 78.85%. In Hiriyur, 10.44% of the population is under 6 years of age.

Regional 
The Vedavati River is dammed here to meet the water needs of the otherwise mostly dry district of Chitradurga.  This place lies on NH4, the Mumbai-Bengaluru National Highway, and is a central place for most commuters travelling to southern and central parts of India via Karnataka. Several villages around Hiriyur like Adivala, have been major producers of coconuts.

See also 
 Chitradurga
 Mari Kanive
 Davanagere
 Aimangala

References 

Cities and towns in Chitradurga district